The Shuttleworth Collection is a working aeronautical and automotive collection located at the Old Warden Aerodrome, Old Warden in Bedfordshire, England.

History 
The collection was founded in 1928 by aviator Richard Ormonde Shuttleworth. While flying a Fairey Battle at night on 2 August 1940, Shuttleworth fatally crashed. His mother, in 1944, formed the Richard Ormonde Shuttleworth Remembrance Trust "for the teaching of the science and practice of aviation and of afforestation and agriculture."

Collection 
 
Restoration and maintenance work is carried out by a staff of 12 full-time and many volunteer engineers. These volunteers are all members of the 3,000-strong Shuttleworth Veteran Aeroplane Society (SVAS). These dedicated enthusiasts are crucial to the preservation and restoration of the collection.

In addition to the aircraft, the collection houses a number of vintage and veteran cars. Events include model-flying days, and once a year, there is a special flying day for schools in the area.

The Shuttleworth Collection puts an emphasis on restoring as many aircraft as possible to flying condition, in line with the founder's original intention. There are typically about ten air shows per year, including evening displays and an annual Flying Proms event.

The Edwardian flying machines 
Some of the most notable aircraft in the collection are the five Edwardian aeroplanes, of which one is the oldest British aeroplane still in flying condition. The oldest, with British civil registration G-AANG, is the Bleriot XI (still with original engine), which dates back to 1909; six years after the Wright brothers' aircraft and the world's oldest airworthy aeroplane, the next oldest being, at only three weeks newer by date of manufacture, the Old Rhinebeck Aerodrome's own restored original Bleriot XI (Bleriot factory serial number 56, with civil registration N60094) in the United States.

Aircraft in the collection 

Data from  
Also resident, but privately owned:
Avro Anson (BAE Systems)
 Miles M14a Hawk Trainer N3788 G-AKPF 
 Westland Wallace replica fuselage
 De Havilland DH89A Rapide G-AGSH painted as British European Airways
 Sopwith Dove G-EAGA

Vehicles in the collection 

 1898  Panhard et Levassor
 1899  Mors Petit Duc
 1899  Benz International dogcart
 1900  Marot Gardan
 1901  Locomobile Steam Car
 1901  Arrol-Johnston
 1902  Baby Peugeot
 1903  Richard-Brasier
 1903  De Dietrich
 1912  Crossley 15
 1912  Wolseley M5
 1913  Morris Oxford
 1920  Hucks starter
 1923  Leyland SG7 bus 
 1926  Jowett Short-chassis tourer
 1931  Austin 16 hp "Burnham"
 1935  Austin Seven
 1937  Railton
 1937  Fiat Topolino
 1937  MG TA
 1939  Hillman Minx RAF Staff Car
 1943  Fordson WOT 2H
 1900  Singer Motor Wheel Motorcycle
 1904  Aurora  Motorcycle
 1921  Scott Squirrel Combination
 1923  Triumph SD  Motorcycle
 1927  Raleigh 14 Motorcycle
 1929  Ariel Motorcycle
 1938  Rudge Motorcycle
 1940  BSA M20 Motorcycle
 1950  Philips Cyclemaster
 1952  Brockhouse Corgi Scooter
 1955  BSA A7 Motorcycle
 1955  New Hudson Motorcycle
 1960  Norton ES2 Motorcycle

There is also a collection of tractors.

See also
 Shuttleworth College (Bedfordshire)

Other large collections of flying historic aircraft
 Battle of Britain Memorial Flight, at RAF Coningsby, United Kingdom
 Cole Palen's Old Rhinebeck Aerodrome, directly inspired by the Shuttleworth collection, located in Red Hook and Rhinebeck, New York.
 Royal Navy Historic Flight, at RNAS Yeovilton, United Kingdom
 The Fighter Collection, at Duxford Aerodrome, United Kingdom
 Historic Aircraft Restoration Museum, in St Louis, Missouri

Notes

Bibliography
 Ellis, Ken. Wrecks and Relics - 19th Edition, Midland Publishing, Hinckley, Leicestershire. 2004. .
 Guttery, T.E. The Shuttleworth Collection. London: Wm. Carling & Co, 1969. .
 Ogilvy, David. The Shuttleworth Collection. Shrewsbury, Shropshire, UK: Airlife Publishing Ltd., 1989 (revised edition 1994). .
 Ogilvy, David. Shuttleworth - The Historic Aeroplanes. Shrewsbury, Shropshire, UK: Airlife Publishing Ltd., 1989 .

External links
 Official site

Aerospace museums in England
Museums in Bedfordshire
Automobile museums in England